William Orlando Casey (18 December 1872 – 25 November 1915) was an Australian rules footballer who played with Carlton in the Victorian Football League (VFL). After leaving Carlton, he went on to play for Northcote Juniors and Brunswick.

Notes

External links 

		
Bill Casey's profile at Blueseum

1872 births
1915 deaths
Australian rules footballers from Tasmania
Carlton Football Club (VFA) players
Carlton Football Club players
Brunswick Football Club players